BroadbandTV Corporation is a Canadian media and technology company founded by CEO Shahrzad Rafati in 2005. In 2019, the company was the second-largest video property by unique viewers, according to comScore. Its head office is in Vancouver, British Columbia, Canada. BBTV's clients include the NBA, Viacom, and Sony Pictures.

History

2005-2009
BBTV was founded as an OTT set-top box company in 2005, but the company soon turned to the digital video space. Rafati's idea was to create software which would change how companies approached piracy, resulting in technology which enabled companies to claim and monetize content uploaded by fans.

In 2009, the NBA became a client of BBTV's and success monetizing NBA footage in fan videos led to organizations like Sony Pictures quickly signing up. BBTV expanded to work with individual YouTube channels who also wanted to monetize their content.

2010–2015
European media group RTL bought 51% of BBTV in 2013 for $36M USD.

In fall 2014, BBTV opened offices in New York City, to host the company's branded entertainment division, which brokers deals between content creators and brands.

By December 2015 BBTV had become the number one MCN globally, outperforming Disney's Maker Studios. After that, the company began creating more content in-house.

2016–present
In 2016, BBTV moved its Vancouver office to a bigger space.

It expanded on its working relationship with Sony Pictures in 2018 by co-releasing the official Breaking Bad YouTube channel.

In the same year, BBTV also launched its Interactive division, devoted to original games and mobile apps built around digital IP and audiences, as well as its Distribution and Label services for artists.

In 2019, BBTV announced that its content garnered 575 million unique viewers each month, making it second only to Google in terms of all monthly internet viewership, per a February 2019 comScore study.

Investments, partnerships & acquisitions 

In June 2013, BroadbandTV received a $36 million private placement from RTL Group.  At the time, this marked the largest private placement into an internet media company in Canada since 2007.

In April 2014, TV production firm FremantleMedia partnered with BroadbandTV to identify and manage user-uploaded content on YouTube for more than 200 shows, including American Idol, The Price Is Right, America's Got Talent, Baywatch, and The X Factor.  In September 2014, BBTV signed a multi-year original content agreement with FremantleMedia North America's digital studio, Tiny Riot "to produce original programming in the entertainment, gaming, and music genres."

In August 2014, BBTV renewed its existing YouTube rights-management deal with the National Basketball Association to manage fan-uploaded content on the site.  The NBA channel is the largest professional sports channel on YouTube, boasting over 5.6 million subscribers and more than 2.2 billion page views at the time of the renewal. In 2016, BBTV and The NBA also launched NBA Playmakers, a new digital entertainment brand focused around basketball culture.

In April 2015, BroadbandTV acquired  YoBoHo, which operates the HooplaKidz children's brand on YouTube. HooplaKidz is the largest preschool and K-12 educational digital-first producer on YouTube.

In summer 2015, BroadbandTV partnered with leading YouTube analytics website SocialBlade "to supply data and services to its community of users". SocialBlade previously offered partnership through Maker Studios' entry-level partnership program, Maker Gen.

In August 2020, Jukin Media announced partnerships with BroadbandTV and Fullscreen.

Technology brands 
Its technology bands include VISO Catalyst, VISO NOVI, and VISO Prism.

Strategic Partners 
In 2020, Mlath Alaml for Art Production Company began contracting with BroadbandTV Corporation as a strategic partner in the Middle East, specifically in the Persian Gulf region. This relationship has grown to manage over 100 channels, and the partnership is still ongoing.

References 

Canadian companies established in 2005
Mass media companies established in 2005
Companies based in Vancouver
Companies listed on the Toronto Stock Exchange
Digital media
Internet broadcasting
Mass media companies of Canada
2005 establishments in British Columbia
2020 initial public offerings